Titter Khel is a village of Lakki Marwat District, Khyber Pakhtunkhwa, Pakistan. It is also known as Tattar Khel and as Umar Titter Khel.

Location
It is located on Dera Bannu Road, N 55 Highway, about 30 km from Lakki Marwat City.

Education
1) Govt high school for boys. 2) Govt Higher secondary school for Girls. 3) 5 Govt primary schools for boys and two for girls.

Sports
Kabbadi, Cricket, Football and Volleyball are played here.

Language
The people of Titter Khel speak Pashto, but the national language Urdu is also spoken. There are some good English speakers.

References

Lakki Marwat District